Fireman's Insurance Company Building is an historic building in Washington, D.C.

History
The Queen Anne-style building, at 303 Seventh Street, N.W., was completed in 1882.

The Fireman's Insurance Company owned the building through the 1950s.

References

External links

Aerial view of Fireman’s Insurance building, DC Past

Buildings and structures in Washington, D.C.